Palaquium hinmolpedda is a tree in the family Sapotaceae. The specific epithet hinmolpedda is from a Sinhalese name for the species.

Description
The bark is smooth.

Distribution and habitat
Palaquium hinmolpedda is endemic to Sri Lanka.

Conservation
Palaquium hinmolpedda has been assessed as Near Threatened on the IUCN Red List. The species is threatened by logging and harvesting. Some protection is afforded by the species' presence in protected areas including Kanneliya Forest Reserve.

References

hinmolpedda
Endemic flora of Sri Lanka
Plants described in 1960